Olena Khlopotnova (also , Yelena Khlopotnova née Stetsura, in first marriage Kokonova; born 4 August 1963) is a long jumper who represented the USSR and later Ukraine. Her personal best jump of 7.31 metres, achieved in Alma Ata on 12 September 1985, puts her 9th in the all-time performers list.

International competitions

References
 

1963 births
Living people
Ukrainian female long jumpers
Soviet female long jumpers
World Athletics Championships athletes for Ukraine
Universiade medalists in athletics (track and field)
Universiade bronze medalists for the Soviet Union
Medalists at the 1991 Summer Universiade